The Beautiful Person is a 2008 French teen comedy-drama film directed by Christophe Honoré from a screenplay he co-wrote with Gilles Taurand. It is a modernised adaptation of the 1678 French novel La Princesse de Clèves. Honoré was inspired to make the film after then-French president Nicolas Sarkozy repeatedly criticised the book as irrelevant in regard to modern life.

Originally intended as a television film, The Beautiful Person aired on Arte on 12 September 2008, ahead of its theatrical release in France on 17 September.

Plot
Following the death of her mother, 16-year-old Junie transfers to the school that her cousin Mathias attends. She instantly attracts the attention of several of her new classmates, especially the shy, sensitive Otto. In Italian class, a record of Maria Callas singing Lucia plays, which causes Junie to rush out crying, leaving her belongings behind. The teacher, Nemours, sees a photo of her taken by another student and swipes it. Afterwards, Nemours pursues her, even though she has mixed feelings about it. He is so enamored by her that he breaks off his relationships with Florence Perrin, a teacher, and Marie, a student.

Nemours switches seats with Mathias during a field trip. Marie finds a letter left on the seat and it spreads throughout the student body. This letter is a love letter that all of the students think was written by Nemours. Junie, upon reading the letter, becomes very upset, believing that Nemours is in love with somebody else. Mathias goes to Nemours and explains that it was his letter from another boy named Martin and asked him to say that it belonged to the teacher.

One of Otto's friends from the Russian-language class is asked to spy on Junie after she acts cold to Otto and sees Nemours acting tender to Junie. He mistakes it for kissing and Otto confronts Junie about the misunderstanding. She denies it and goes home. Otto kills himself the next day by jumping from a very high floor at school. After Otto's suicide, Junie skips school for three weeks, coming only after Nemours tells Mathias that he will be taking sick leave until the end of the semester.

Nemours follows Junie around and she decides to approach him. He asks for some time to talk to her and they are seen running around the city like children. He takes her back to his room where she starts talking about love. He takes her home where they arrange a date for 5pm the following day. Nemours waits until seven, then calls Mathias. Mathias comes down and tells Nemours that Junie left the previous day, and he is not allowed to say where and to forget about her. Junie also said she never wanted to see Nemours again. Junie is seen on a ship departing for somewhere else.

Cast
In parenthesis are the corresponding characters from La Princesse de Clèves, and where appropriate the historical originals.

Accolades

References

External links
 
 

2008 films
2008 comedy-drama films
2000s French-language films
2000s high school films
2000s teen comedy-drama films
Films about scandalous teacher–student relationships
Films based on French novels
Films based on works by Madame de La Fayette
Films directed by Christophe Honoré
Films set in Paris
Films shot in Paris
French high school films
French teen comedy-drama films
French television films
2000s French films